Hunding is a municipality in the district of Deggendorf in Bavaria in Germany.

References

Deggendorf (district)